Al-Judeira is a Palestinian village in the Jerusalem Governorate of the State of Palestine, in the central West Bank.

According to the Palestinian Central Bureau of Statistics, the town had a population of 2,121 in 2006.

Toponymy 

Location

To the east is Kalandia, Rafat is to the north, Al Jib is to the west, and Bir Nabala is to the south.

History

Ancient period 
Several scholars have suggested that Judeira is the site of Gederah in Benjamin, which is mentioned in the Bible as home to Yozabad the Gederathite, a Benjaminite warrior who defected to David. It is mentioned shortly after the nearby sites of Azmaveth (identified with modern-day Hizme), Anathoth (probably 'Anata) and Gibeon (Al Jib).

Ottoman era
In the Ottoman census of the 1500s,   Jadira was noted as a village located in the nahiya of Jerusalem.

In 1838 el-Jedireh was noted as a Muslim village, located north of Jerusalem.

In 1863 Guérin described it as a small village, with a mosque consecrated to a Sheikh Yassin. In the courtyard in front of this sanctuary, he noticed what was possibly an old Corinthian capital, which had been made into a mortar, where the villagers pounded coffee. An Ottoman village list from about 1870  found that the village had a population of 40, in a total of 13 houses, though the population count only included men. It was also noted that it was located east of Al Jib.

In 1883, the PEF's Survey of Western Palestine (SWP) described it as "a small village on a slope, surrounded by figs and olives, and with rock-cut tombs to the north."

British Mandate era
In the 1922 census of Palestine conducted by the British Mandate authorities, Ijdireh had a population of 122, all Muslims, increasing in the 1931 census  to 139 Muslim inhabitants, in 31 inhabited houses.

In  the 1945 statistics Judeira had a population of 190 Muslims, with 2,044 dunams of land, according to an official land and population survey. Of this, 353 dunams were plantations and irrigable land, 1,314 used for cereals, while 7 dunams were built-up (urban) land.

Jordanian era
In the wake of the 1948 Arab–Israeli War, and after the 1949 Armistice Agreements, al-Judeira came under Jordanian rule.

The Jordanian census of 1961 found 328 inhabitants in Judeira.

Post-1967

Since the Six-Day War in 1967, al-Judeira has been under Israeli occupation.

After the 1995 accords, 25.4% of the village’s land was classified as Area B, the remaining 74.6% is classified was Area C.

In 2005, Israel started the construction of a separation barrier around al-Judeira, Al Jib, Bir Nabala, Beit Hanina al-Balad and Kalandiya. The wall was built on Palestinian land seized by Military Orders. The wall completely surrounds the villages, forming an enclave.

References

Bibliography

 (p. 43)

External links
 Welcome To Judayra
Survey of Western Palestine, Map 17:  IAA, Wikimedia commons 
 Al Judeira Village (Fact Sheet),  Applied Research Institute–Jerusalem (ARIJ)
 Al Judeira Village Profile, ARIJ
 Al Judeira area photo, ARIJ
 Locality Development Priorities and Needs in Al Judeira, ARIJ

Seam Zone
Villages in the West Bank
Jerusalem Governorate
Municipalities of the State of Palestine